Westlawn Cemetery is a Jewish cemetery located in Norridge, a suburb of Chicago in Illinois.

Notable interments
 Leonard S. Chess, record company executive
 Virginia Lee Corbin, actress
 Sandy Dvore, artist
 Richard Elrod, jurist, sheriff, and legislator
 Jack Ruby, convicted of the murder of Lee Harvey Oswald, who at the time was under arrest for the assassination of US President John F. Kennedy(His conviction was later reversed.  He died awaiting a new trial, still legally presumed innocent.)
 Abe Saperstein, creator of the Savoy Big Five, precursor of the Harlem Globetrotters
 Harry Sawyer, Jewish-American organized crime boss based in the Twin Cities, co-conspirator and protector of the Dillinger and Barker-Karpis Gangs.
 Shel Silverstein, poet, author, satirist, and cartoonist
 Gene Siskel, film critic

Vandalism
Westlawn was the site of gravestone desecration in January 2008. At least 57 tombstones were defaced with anti-Semitic slogans. Using white and blue spray paint, the vandal drew swastikas and slurs on tombstones in a western section of the cemetery.
A 21-year-old Polish immigrant male was charged with the crime in February 2008. He has been directly linked by police to a neo-Nazi organization in the Chicago area. He was convicted on two charges of felony vandalism and sentenced to 7 years in prison, the maximum sentence.

References

External links 
 
 Google Maps view of the cemetery

1937 establishments in Illinois
Cemeteries in Chicago
Jewish cemeteries in Illinois
Jews and Judaism in Chicago
Cemetery vandalism and desecration